Bayin is a village in Shan State, Taunggyi District, Hsi Hseng Township. This village has a police station, a hospital, and a high school. There are two armies, no (425) and (426) which are located in the front of the village. They are built on the slope of small mountains.

Transport
It is served by a station on Myanmar Railways. Other transportation is carried by highway expresses.

See also
 Transport in Myanmar

References

 Populated places in Mandalay Region